Sporting C.P. Youth Academy is the youth development division of Sporting Clube de Portugal (Academia Sporting in Alcochete), which accommodated Portugal during the Euro 2004 competition. Sporting's youth system helped develop footballers such as Ballon d'Or recipients Cristiano Ronaldo and Luís Figo.

Youth Squads

Sporting U23 team

Staff
Head coach: Filipe Pedro
Assistant coach: Tiago Farinha
Assistant coach: João Pereira
GK Coach: Dário Ezequiel
Fitness coach: Bruno Dias

Sporting U19 team - Juniores

 
 
 

 

Staff
Head coach: Pedro Coelho
Assistant coach: Paulo Carvalho
Assistant coach: Bernardo Caetano
GK Coach: Rodolfo Vieira
Fitness coach: Pedro Cardoso

Sporting U17 team - Juvenis

 
 
 

 

Staff
Head coach: José João
Assistant coach: André Krus
Assistant coach: José Caldeira
GK Coach: Luis Caetano
Fitness coach: João Marmeleira

Sporting U15 team - Iniciados

 
 
 

 

Staff
Head coach: Bernardo Bruschy
Assistant coaches: Fábio Roque
Assistant coaches: João Lourenço
GK Coach: João Santos

The Academy
Sporting's Academy was also the first and only sports academy in Europe to receive the ISO9001:2008 – a quality certification awarded by EIC, a Portuguese anonymous society responsible for this type of reward, which is recognised both locally and internationally.

Facilities
Budgeted around 2000$00 million (2 million contos), the construction of the academy commenced in August 1999 in the council of Alcochete, located on the outskirts of Lisbon on the southern bank of the river Tejo, and the inauguration was on June 21, 2002. The main building of the academy has two different areas, the professional football area and the youth area. In both sides there is medical center equipped with treatment rooms, gym, Turkish bath, Jacuzzi and bedrooms. In the youth area, there are also several study rooms. The academy is equipped with a main field, four grass pitches for training, a synthetic field and a grassed area for goalkeepers training.

Sporting's youth academy was one of the training grounds for the Portugal national football team during Euro 2004. A number of European clubs choose the Sporting's Academia for training in the off-season.

Youth program
Sporting CP Youth Program helped produce two FIFA World Player of the Year winners (Luís Figo and Cristiano Ronaldo), two Ballon d'Or winners (Luís Figo and Cristiano Ronaldo) and one runner-up (Paulo Futre), and one FIFA Ballon d'Or winner (Cristiano Ronaldo).

Notable Academy graduates
List criteria
Player has made 25 appearances or more for his country at full international level
Player who has been at least nominated for a "world's best men's player" award (Ballon d'Or, FIFA World Player of the Year / The Best FIFA Men's Player or FIFA Ballon d'Or).

References

External links
 The Sporting CP academy way – These Football Times (2015)

Football academies in Portugal
Sporting CP
Youth football in Portugal
UEFA Youth League teams
NextGen series